Chinese Volleyball Association (Simplified Chinese:中国排球协会) is a national non-governmental, nonprofit sports organization in the People's Republic of China. It represents China in the Fédération Internationale de Volleyball and the Asian Volleyball Confederation, as well as the volleyball sports in the All-China Sports Federation. It also manages men's and women's national volleyball team of China and organizes Chinese Volleyball Super League .

See also
China men's national volleyball team
China women's national volleyball team
Chinese Volleyball Super League

External links
Official Website

National members of the Asian Volleyball Confederation
Volleyball
Volleyball
Sports organizations established in 1953
1953 establishments in China